Shane Birss (born 11 March 1983) is an Australian rules football player.

Birss played for both St Kilda and the Western Bulldogs in the Australian Football League (AFL).  He was drafted with the 26th pick by the Western Bulldogs from the Gippsland Under 18s in the 2000 AFL Draft. Debuting in 2002, Birss was unable to play consistently to establish himself in the Bulldogs' senior side, playing 51 games and kicking 20 goals in five seasons.

Birss was traded to St Kilda during the 2006 Trade period for their fourth Round draft selection at Number 59.  He played two seasons for St Kilda before being delisted at the end of the 2008 AFL season.  Birss was then recruited by South Australian Football League (SANFL) club West Adelaide where he went on play more than 100 games.

References

 AFL Record 2006 Season Preview, ed.  Michael Lovett, AFL Publishing.

External links

1983 births
Living people
Australian rules footballers from Victoria (Australia)
Western Bulldogs players
St Kilda Football Club players
West Adelaide Football Club players
Gippsland Power players
Sale Football Club players